Taiwani yoshimotoi is a moth of the family Erebidae first described by Michael Fibiger in 2008. It is known from Taiwan.

Adults have been found in April and August. It probably occurs in several generations.

The wingspan is 12–15 mm. The forewing is relatively narrow and long. The median and terminal area are dark brown, while the basal and postmedian area is light brown. The latter is gradually darker distally. There is a bright, ovoid, yellow reniform stigma. The crosslines are all present, well marked and waved. The terminal line is marked by tight black interveinal spots. The hindwing is brown, with an indistinct discal spot. The underside of the upper forewing is part brownish, but otherwise grey brown and without a pattern. The underside of the upper hindwing is part brownish and the lower part is light grey, with a discal spot.

References

Micronoctuini
Moths described in 2008